The Cetinje District ( / Цетињски срез) was a former district within Montenegro. The administrative centre of the Cetinje District was Cetinje.

Municipalities
The district encompassed the municipalities of:
Bar
Budva
Cetinje
Herceg Novi
Kotor
Ostros
Rijeka Crnojevića
Tivat
Ulcinj
Virpazar

Demographics

See also
Districts of Montenegro
Administrative divisions of Montenegro

Districts of Montenegro